Enoch Williams Bagshaw (January 31, 1884 – October 3, 1930) was an American football player and coach. From 1921 to 1929, he served as the head football coach at the University of Washington, compiling a 63–22–6 record. His 1923 and 1926 squads went 10–1–1, equaling the best marks of his career. He was a five-year starter on the football team at Washington.

Biography
Bagshaw was born in Flint, Flintshire, Wales and moved in 1892 with his family to the State of Washington, where he was raised.  He served as a first lieutenant with the 43rd Engineer Battalion of the United States Army during World War I.

Bagshaw was appointed supervisor of transportation for Washington state in 1930.  He died at the age of 46, on October 3, 1930, after collapsing at the Old Capitol Building in Olympia, Washington.

Head coaching record

References

External links
 

1884 births
1930 deaths
American football ends
American football halfbacks
American football quarterbacks
Washington Huskies football coaches
Washington Huskies football players
High school football coaches in Washington (state)
United States Army personnel of World War I
United States Army officers
People from Flint, Flintshire
Sportspeople from Flintshire
Players of American football from Washington (state)
British emigrants to the United States